Lukas Britschgi (born 17 February 1998) is a Swiss figure skater. He is the 2023 European bronze medalist, the 2022 CS Budapest Trophy silver medalist, the 2022 CS Warsaw Cup bronze  medalist, and a three-time Swiss national champion (2019–20, 2022). His bronze medal at the 2023 Europeans was the highest finish for a Swiss skater of any discipline at the European Championships in over a decade.

Britschgi trains in Oberstdorf, Germany.

Programs

Competitive highlights 
GP: Grand Prix; CS: Challenger Series; JGP: Junior Grand Prix

Detailed results 
Small medals for short and free programs are awarded only at ISU Championships. Current ISU world bests highlighted in bold and italic. Personal bests are highlighted in bold.

Senior level

References

External links 
 
 

1998 births
Swiss male single skaters
Living people
People from Schaffhausen
Sportspeople from the canton of Schaffhausen
Figure skaters at the 2022 Winter Olympics
Olympic figure skaters of Switzerland